Khung Taphao is a tambon (sub-district) of Mueang Uttaradit District, in Uttaradit Province, Thailand. In 2016 it had a population of 8,899 people.

Administration

Central administration
The tambon is divided into eight administrative villages (muban).

Local administration
The area of the sub-district is covered by the sub-district municipality (Thesaban Tambon) Khung Taphao (เทศบาลตำบลคุ้งตะเภา).

References

External links
Thaitambon.com on Khung Taphao

Tambon of Uttaradit province
Populated places in Uttaradit province